Chirotechnology in materials science is the chemistry and technology of production and separation of enantiomers.

References

 

Materials science